Creutz may refer to:

People
 Creutz family, a family in the Swedish and Finnish nobility
 Gustaf Philip Creutz (1731–1785), Swedish statesman, diplomat and poet
 Max Creutz (1876–1932), German art historian and museum director
 Michael Creutz (born 1944), American theoretical physicist
 Rudolf Creutz (1896–1980), Austrian Nazi and high-ranking member of the SS
 Edvard Sylou-Creutz (1881–1945), Norwegian classical pianist, composer and radio personality

Science
Creutz-Taube Ion, a metal complex with the formula Ru(NH3)5]2(C4H4N2)5+

See also
Kreuz (disambiguation)
Kreutz (disambiguation)